Cristian Daniel Dal Bello Fagundes (born 13 December 1999), known as Cristian, is a Brazilian professional footballer who plays as a forward for Mladost GAT, a club based in the Serbian city of Novi Sad

Club career
In June 2021, Cristian switched to Ukrainian club Zorya Luhansk.

At the end of 2022, Christian joined Serbian Superliga side Mladost GAT.

References

External links
 

1999 births
Living people
Brazilian footballers
Brazilian expatriate footballers
Association football forwards
Grêmio Esportivo Brasil players
Botafogo Futebol Clube (PB) players
FC Zorya Luhansk players
Ukrainian Premier League players
Campeonato Brasileiro Série B players
Campeonato Brasileiro Série C players
Expatriate footballers in Ukraine
Brazilian expatriate sportspeople in Ukraine